Rakhahi is a village in West Champaran district in the Indian state of Bihar.

Demographics
As of 2011 India census, Rakhahi had a population of 2984 in 522 households. Males constitute 52.84% of the population and females 47.15%. Rakhahi has an average literacy rate of 38.53%, lower than the national average of 74%: male literacy is 63%, and female literacy is 35.9%. In Rakhahi, 22.3% of the population is under 6 years of age.

References

shahabuddin ali villg po rakhahi

Villages in West Champaran district